Mirwaiz (from mir, chief and waiz, preacher) is a hereditary institution of head priests that is unique to the Kashmir Valley. The traditional role of mirwaizes is to provide religious education in the shrines and mosques. Over time, the mirwaizes also took up social, cultural and political activities.

There are two main mirwaiz lineages in Kashmir: Mirwaiz of Kashmir has its seat at the historic Jama Masjid in Srinagar. The other lineage, known as Mirwaiz Hamadani (after Ali Hamadani), is based at the historic Khanqah-e-Moula mosque. Each lineage is traditionally the preserve of a single family that traces its roots to an ancestor who arrived to Kashmir together with Mir Sayyid Ali Hamadani in the 14th century.

The rivalry between the two lineages, which were frequently involved in local politics, has historically been a cause of clashes, including violent ones.

Notable holders of the title  
Moulvi Siddique-Ullah (1075-1155 H) known as Siddiq Baba and his son Akhund Moulvi Abdussalam  (1129-1209 H) are buried in the outskirts of Srinagar where they lived and preached Islam. Akhund Moulvi Abdussalam had five sons, one of them, Hafiz Ghulam Rasool Shah - known as Lasa Baba - was the first one to obtain the title of Mir waizi Kashmir. (Head Preacher of Kashmir). Wali Ullah, Rahim Shah, Abdullah Shah, and Bandah Shah, the other four are known as Mirwaiz Hamadan.

Haji Muhammad Yahya (1251-1308 H) took over the office and continued his father's work. He was the first one to translate Ama Yata Saaloon, the 30th chapter of Quran, into Kashmiri language. Out of his four sons Moulana Rasool Shah the 2nd (1271-1327 H) also known as Sir Sayyed-e-Kashmir, was a pioneer in introducing modern education in Kashmir under the banner of Anjuman-e-Nasratul-Islam.

Moulana Ahmadullah Shah (1285-1349 H) and Moulana Atique Ullah Shah (1291-1381H) took the title of Mirwaiz Kashmir one after another.

Atique Ullah Shah was unable to perform his duties due to old age and ill health, therefore Moulana Muhammad Yousuf Shah, (1313-1388H) second son of Moulana Rasool Shah and a graduate of the Deoband Institute of Islamic Studies was designated the next Mirwaiz. Moulana Mohammad Noor Ud Din Shah (1912–1997) was assigned the duties of Naib- Mirwaiz who was the youngest son of Atique Ullah Shah and a graduate from Oriental College, Lahore. They are buried in Muzaffarabad and Islamabad respectively.
Mirwaizi Kashmir Moulana Muhammad Yousuf Shah translated the Quran in Kasmiri language is the most authentic translation also published by King Fahad Press in Madinah Munawwarah and distributed free to all Kashmiries performing Huj or Umrah.Mirwaiz Maulana Muhammad Noor ud Din Shah also translated Amayatasaaloon 30th chapter of Quran in Kashmiri language so as to facilitate and understand the meanings as its mostly read during five times prayers.
Mirwaiz Yusuf Shah is believed to have developed good relations with the world-famous scholar Muhammad Asad who had come to Kashmir in the year 1934.

After the death of Atique Ullah Shah in 1962, his grandson Moulvi Muhammad Farooque became Naib Mirwaiz Kashmir. He became the Mirwaiz after the death of his uncle Muhammad Yousuf Shah in 1968. Mirwaizi Kashmir Mirwaiz Muhammad Umar Farooq took over the charge after his father was assassinated in May 1990 at the age of 17.

The other lineage is traditionally based in Srinagar popularly known as Mirwaiz Hamdani with its seat in Markaz-i-Islam Kashmir Ziyarat Shah-e-Hamdan Ameer-i-Kabir Mir Syed Ali Hamdani historic Khanqah-e-Moula Srinagar.

Notable among Hamdani (Mirwaiz) Clan are Mirwaiz Moulvi Sidiq followed by Mirwaiz Moulvi Salah -[40 Years], Mirwaiz Moulvi Ghulam-[36 Years], The Late Mujhahid-i-Millat Mirwaiz Moulvi Ahmadullah Hamdani -[32 Years], followed by his son Mirwaiz Moulvi Ghulam Nabi Hamdani -[26 Years], Mirwaiz Moulana Moulvi Muhammad Yaseen Hamdani -[54 Years] followed by his son the present Mirwaiz Moulana Moulvi Riyaz Ahmad Hamdani.

References

Bibliography
 
 

Kashmir
Titles in India